Prosfora ("offering"), is an uninhabited Greek islet, close to the coast of Lasithi, eastern Crete. Administratively it lies within the Sitia municipality of Lasithi.

See also
List of islands of Greece

Landforms of Lasithi
Uninhabited islands of Crete
Islands of Greece